Elita is a given name. Notable people with the name include:

 Elita Karim (born 1982), Bangladeshi singer and journalist
 Elita Kļaviņa (born 1966), Latvian actress
 Elita Krūmiņa (born 1965), Latvian government official
 Elita Löfblad (born 1980), Chilean-born Swedish model and reality show contestant
 Elita Loresca (born 1977), Filipino-American newscaster
 Elita Proctor Otis (1851 or 1860–1927), American actress
 Elita Veidemane (born 1955), Latvian journalist and publicist

See also
 Alita (disambiguation)

Latvian feminine given names